To Gillian On Her 37th Birthday is an American play by Michael Brady, in 1984.  It was developed through the literary department of the Ensemble Studio Theatre and M Square Entertainment and moved to Circle-In-The-Square.

Plot 
To Gillian on Her 37th Birthday is a play in two acts. The time is the present. The place is the back deck and beach of David's island home. The action traces the final weekend of August.

Characters 

 David - age 37, college professor temporarily retired.
 Rachel - age 16, David's daughter
 Cindy - age 16, Rachel's friend
 Paul - age 38, David's brother-in-law, married to Esther
 Esther - age 39, David's sister-in-law, a psychologist, married to Paul
 Kevin - age 28, female, friend of Paul and Esther, recently divorced
 Gillian - age 35, David's former wife who died in a sailing accident two years prior to the events of the play, Esther's sister, Rachel's mom

Plot 
David loves his wife, Gillian. Unfortunately, she died two years ago. David deals with his grief by continuing his romance with Gillian during walks with her "ghost" on the beach at night. While David lives in the past, other family problems crop up in the present in the real world. Esther and Paul come for a visit to try to help Rachel. She has lost her mother and needs her father to snap back into the real world and help her.

Adaptations 
In 1996, it was produced as a film by Sony Pictures and starred Peter Gallagher, Claire Danes, Kathy Baker, and Wendy Crewson.

Awards 
It was awarded the Oppenheimer Award for best play of 1983.

Publication

 To Gillian On Her 37th Birthday" is published by Broadway Play Publishing Inc.

References

External links

1984 plays
American plays